Ben Saynor (born 6 March 1989) is an English footballer who plays for Frickley Athletic as a goalkeeper.

Career
He signed professionally for Bradford City at the age of 16. He made his debut senior appearance on 4 September 2007 in a 5–1 Football League Trophy defeat to Doncaster Rovers. On 29 April 2008, Saynor was deemed to be surplus to requirements at Valley Parade and was released by manager Stuart McCall along with 13 other Bradford players. He was given a trial with Mansfield Town, playing 45 minutes of their pre-season friendly with Matlock Town on 7 August 2008, which Mansfield won 2–0, but was not signed. Instead, on 7 November 2008, he joined Conference North side Farsley Celtic as their second-choice goalkeeper behind Curtis Aspden. The following day, he took his place on the bench in Farsley's 2–0 victory away at Workington.

In early 2010 he was playing for Ossett Albion before he joined Stalybridge Celtic but left in August without having played a first team game. He then joined Bridlington Town in September 2010. After leaving Bridlington Town at the start of the 2011/2012 season he joined Frickley Athletic in August 2011.

References

External links

1989 births
Living people
Footballers from Leeds
English footballers
Association football goalkeepers
Bradford City A.F.C. players
Farsley Celtic A.F.C. players
Scarborough Athletic F.C. players
Ossett Albion A.F.C. players
Stalybridge Celtic F.C. players
Bridlington Town A.F.C. players
Frickley Athletic F.C. players
National League (English football) players